Seddio is an Italian surname, found primarily in Sicily and specifically in the province of Agrigento.

Origins
Seddio is one of the common Sicilian surnames of Arabic origins. Typical of Porto Empedocle and Agrigento area. Present in Sicily only after the Arabic invasion of the region around 800 AD. Probably from the Arabic word Sidi, or from an Latinized form of the more common name Siddiqui, often rendered as Siddiqi, Siddique, Siddiquee, Siddighi, Sadighi, Seddighi, Sidiki, Siddiki, or Siddiquie.

Distribution
Seddio surname is found principally in Italy, in the US and in Switzerland.

References

External links
Cognomiitaliani.org
Cognomix.it

Italian-language surnames